Episcirrus is a genus of hidden snout weevils in the beetle family Curculionidae. There are at least four described species in Episcirrus.

Species
These four species belong to the genus Episcirrus:
 Episcirrus brachialis (LeConte, 1884)
 Episcirrus isolepus Poinar & Legalov, 2014
 Episcirrus propugnator Kuschel, 1958
 Episcirrus singularis (Chevrolat, 1880)

References

Further reading

 
 
 

Cryptorhynchinae
Articles created by Qbugbot